Ernest Franklin Bozman (1895–1968) was a British writer and the editor of two editions of Everyman's Encyclopaedia.

Works 
 Mountain Essays (1928)
 X plus Y: a novel (1936)
 The Traveller's Return (1938)
 British Hills and Mountains (1940), with James Horst Brunnerman Bell and John Fairfax-Blakeborough
 Phil Empresson (1944)
 Ressemblance Garantie (1947), with Michel Arnaud, René Lalou & Miron Grindea
 Ghana - Inertial Navigation (1967)
 Infallibility - Lobachevsk (1967)

Translations 
 In Defence of Letters (1939), by Georges Duhamel
 Cry Out of the Depths'' (1953), by Georges Duhamel

1895 births
1968 deaths
20th-century British translators